Lips on Lips is the second extended play by American singer Tiffany Young. The EP was released on February 22, 2019 by Transparent Arts and consists of five tracks including the title tracks, "Born Again" and "Lips on Lips".

Background and release 
In October 2017, after her contract with SM Entertainment ended, she signed with Paradigm Talent Agency. In that year, Tiffany released several songs as a soloist, and on January 25, 2019, she released "Born Again" and on the same day, it was announced that it would be part of the EP, Lips on Lips.

Lips on Lips was released on February 22 on various music platforms, such as iTunes, Spotify, Apple Music and others. On the day of the album's release, Tiffany did a V Live broadcast, where she told fans about the new album and performed several songs.

Track listing

Promotion 
She promoted the EP through her Lips on Lips Mini Showcase Tour, which spanned eight dates around North America in March 2019.

Charts

Sales

References 

2019 EPs
Tiffany Young albums